Bruna Linzmeyer (born 11 November 1992) is a Brazilian actress.

Biography 
Born in Corupá, state of Santa Catarina. Bruna's father is German, while her mother is of Portuguese, Spanish, Native Brazilian and African descent.

Career 
She started her career working as a model and when she was 15 years old, Bruna Linzmeyer won a beauty contest named Garota Verão, promoted by the Grupo RBS, who is Rede Globo's subsidiary in Santa Catarina. Bruna Linzmeyer was cast to play a Russian character named Tatiana Dovichenko in the 2010 Rede Globo miniseries Afinal, o Que Querem as Mulheres?, by Luiz Fernando Carvalho, working with the actor Michel Melamed, who is 16 years older than her, and started a relationship with him during the production of the television show. The actress moved to Rio de Janeiro to play Leila Machado in the 2011 telenovela Insensato Coração. Bruna Linzmeyer played a clairvoyant named Clara in the episode "A Vidente de Diamantina" of the 2012 television series As Brasileiras, and in the same year she played Anabela in Rede Globo's remake of the telenovela Gabriela. Bruna Linzmeyer played an autistic person named Linda in the 2013 Rede Globo telenovela Amor à Vida. She played the teacher Juliana, who is the lead character, in the 2014 remake of the telenovela Meu Pedacinho de Chão. Bruna Linzmeyer plays Cibele Dantas in the 2017 telenovela A Força do Querer, by Glória Perez, one of the eight main characters of the telenovela, who gets involved in a love triangle with Ísis Valverde and Fiuk characters.

Filmography

Cinema

Television

Theater

Web

Discography

Single

Awards and nominations

References

External links 

1992 births
Living people
People from Corupá
Brazilian people of German descent
Brazilian people of Portuguese descent
Brazilian people of Spanish descent
Brazilian people of indigenous peoples descent
Brazilian telenovela actresses
Brazilian television actresses
Brazilian film actresses
Brazilian stage actresses
Brazilian LGBT actors
LGBT actresses
21st-century Brazilian LGBT people